Roscommon–Leitrim was a parliamentary constituency represented in Dáil Éireann, the lower house of the Irish parliament or Oireachtas from 1969 to 1981. The constituency elected 3 deputies (Teachtaí Dála, commonly known as TDs) to the Dáil, on the system of proportional representation by means of the single transferable vote (PR-STV).

History 
The constituency was created under the Electoral (Amendment) Act 1969, and first used for the 1969 general election. It replaced the previous Roscommon constituency and part of the Sligo–Leitrim constituency.

Its boundaries were revised in 1977, but the number of seats remained unchanged. The constituency was abolished for the 1981 general election, when its territory was divided between the existing Sligo–Leitrim constituency and a new Roscommon constituency.

Boundaries 
It covered most of the County Roscommon and part of County Leitrim.

TDs

Elections

1977 general election

1973 general election

1969 general election

See also 
Dáil constituencies
Politics of the Republic of Ireland
Historic Dáil constituencies
Elections in the Republic of Ireland

References

External links 
Oireachtas Members Database

Dáil constituencies in the Republic of Ireland (historic)
Historic constituencies in County Leitrim
Historic constituencies in County Roscommon
1969 establishments in Ireland
1981 disestablishments in Ireland
Constituencies established in 1969
Constituencies disestablished in 1981